The Santa Cruz County Fairgrounds is located in Watsonville, California. It is home to the Santa Cruz County Fair. The venue also hosts other events throughout the year, including concerts and trade shows. Notable past performers include Whitesnake, Dio, and Joan Jett.

References

Buildings and structures in Santa Cruz County, California
Fairgrounds in California
Music venues in the San Francisco Bay Area
Tourist attractions in Santa Cruz County, California
Watsonville, California